The White House Director of Strategic Communications is a senior member of the President's staff, reporting directly to the President and working in conjunction with the White House Communications Director.

President Donald Trump formed the position in late 2016, naming one of his closest advisors and earliest political aides, Hope Hicks, as the nation's first holder of this office.

The exact responsibilities have yet to be clearly defined, but are assumed to include coordinating media appearances, advising the President on messaging, and serving as a confidant on key matters involving personnel and in executing the President's agenda, an extension of the role Hicks served in the Trump campaign and transition. The position has been left vacant since the end of the Trump administration, with Trump's successor Joe Biden not appointing anyone to the position.

Directors

References

Executive Office of the President of the United States
Strategic Communications